Dimension 5 is an album by American  jazz double-bassist John Lindberg recorded in 1981 for the Italian Black Saint label.

Reception
The Allmusic review by Eugene Chadbourne awarded the album 3 stars stating "Lindberg put together an ensemble for this project that's as sharp as his suit... While it surely can't represent the heights these players can and do reach, in performance and conceptually, it has plenty of exciting moments".

Track listing
All compositions by John Lindberg
 " Eleven Thrice" - 15:44 
 "T'Wixt C and D Part 1" - 4:35 
 "T'Wixt C and D Part 2" - 8:04 
 "Dimension 5" - 14:33
Recorded at CAMI Hall in New York City on February 27, 1981

Personnel
John Lindberg - bass
Hugh Ragin - trumpet, piccolo trumpet
Marty Ehrlich - alto saxophone, flute
Billy Bang - violin
Thurman Barker - drums

References

Black Saint/Soul Note albums
John Lindberg albums
1981 live albums